CARS may refer to:

 Cable television relay service station
 Car Allowance Rebate System, a.k.a. the Consumer Assistance to Recycle and Save program
 Caucasian Achievement and Recognition Scholarship
 Childhood Autism Rating Scale
 Chinese Acute Respiratory Syndrome
 Coherent anti-Stokes Raman spectroscopy
 U.S. Army Combat Arms Regimental System a 1950s reorganisation of the regiments of the US Army
 Confederation of Asia Roller Sports, a sports federation

See also
 Car (disambiguation), for "CARs" and "cars"
 KARS (disambiguation)